The Bayer designation Omicron Cygni (ο Cyg / ο Cygni) is shared by two or three star systems in the constellation Cygnus.  Application of the superscripts to the three stars varies in different publications; the Flamsteed designations are unambiguous:
ο1 Cygni: 31 Cygni, sometimes 30 Cygni
ο2 Cygni: 32 Cygni, sometimes 31 Cygni
ο3 Cygni: sometimes 32 Cygni

Cygni, Omicron
Cygnus (constellation)